Piaski Szlacheckie is a village in the administrative district of Gmina Gorzków, within Krasnystaw County, Lublin Voivodeship, in eastern Poland.

The village has an approximate population of 500.

Notable residents 

 Antoni Patek (1812-1877) - watchmaker, founder of Patek Philippe & Co.

References 

Piaski Szlacheckie